José Antonio Cecchini (born October 8, 1955) is a retired Spanish Wrestler who represented his country in Sambo, Judo and Greco-Roman Wrestling. In 1979 and 1981 he won gold medal at World Sambo Championships. He participated at the 1980 Summer Olympics in judo and was eliminated in second round by Slavko Obadov from Yugoslavia.

References

1955 births
Living people
Spanish sambo practitioners
Spanish male judoka
Olympic judoka of Spain
Judoka at the 1980 Summer Olympics